Mount Pangrango is a dormant stratovolcano located in the Sunda Arc of West Java, Indonesia. The mountain formed by a subduction zone on the southern coast of Java facing the Indian Ocean.

Its peak is called Mandalawangi. The mountain is located northwest of Mount Gede in the vicinity of Gunung Gede Pangrango National Park.

Name
The origin of the name Pangrango is speculated to be from two ancient Sundanese words pang and rango which means "That which huffs and puffs", referring to the past volcanic activity of this mountain.

Geography
The Mandalawangi peak of the mountain is a tripoint where the borders of Bogor, Cianjur and Sukabumi Regencies meet. It is the second highest mountain in West Java after Mount Cereme. The mountain is clearly seen from Bogor and Sukabumi, while it is slightly obscured by the neighboring Mount Gede if seen from Cianjur. On a very clear day it can be seen from Jakarta.

See also
 Cibodas Botanical Garden

References

Pangrango
Pangrango
Biosphere reserves of Indonesia